Rǫgnvaldr is an Old Norse name.

People
 Rǫgnvaldr Guðrøðarson (died 1229), King of the Isles

Derived or cognate names
Given names include:

Rægnald
Ragenald, German
Ragenold, German
Raghnall, Irish and Scottish Gaelic
Raginald, German
Ragnall, Old and Middle Irish
Ragnar, Swedish
Ragnvald, Danish and Norwegian
Ragnvaldr, Norse
Rainald, German
Rainaldo
Rainaldu, Latin
Rainold, German
Ranald, Scottish Gaelic
Raynaldo, Spanish
Regenweald, Old English
Reginald, English
Reginaldas, Lithuanian
Reginaldo, Portuguese
Reginaldus, Latin
Reginold, German
Reginolt, German
Reinald, Old French, Norman and German
Reinaldo, Spanish and Portuguese
Reinhold, German
Reino, Finnish
Reinold, Norman and German
Reinoud, Dutch
Reinout, Dutch
Renald, French
Renaldo
Renaud, French
Renaut, French
Reynald, French
Reynaldo, Portuguese
Reynaud, French
Reynold, English
Rheinallt, Welsh
Rinaldas, Lithuanian
Rinaldo, Italian
Rinalds, Latvian
Rögnvald
Rognvald, Norwegian
Rögnvaldr
Rögnvaldur, Icelandic
Ronald, English and Scottish Gaelic
Ronaldas, Lithuanian
Ronaldo, Portuguese
Ronalds, Latvian

Nicknames include:
Reggie, English
Ron, English
Ronaldinho, Portuguese
Ronnie, English
Ronny, English

See also
 Rey (given name)

References

Old Norse personal names